Geostationary Ocean Color Imager (GOCI), is the world's first geostationary orbit satellite image sensor in order to observe or monitor an ocean-color around the Korean Peninsula [1][2]. The spatial resolution of GOCI is about 500m and the range of target area is about 2,500 km×2,500 km centered on Korean Peninsula. GOCI was loaded on Communication, Ocean, and Meteorological Satellite (COMS) of South Korea which was launched in June, 2010. It will be operated by Korea Ocean Satellite Center (KOSC) at  Korea Institute of Ocean Science & Technology (KIOST), and capture the images of ocean-color around the Korean Peninsula 8 times a day for 7.7 years.

The ocean data products that can be derived from the measurements are mainly the chlorophyll concentration, the optical diffuse attenuation coefficients, the concentration of dissolved organic material or yellow substance, and the concentration of suspended particles in the near-surface zone of the sea. In operational oceanography, satellite derived data products are used in conjunction with numerical models and in situ measurements to provide forecasting and now casting of the ocean state. Such information is of genuine interest for many categories of users.

Vision and goals
Detecting, monitoring and predicting short term biophysical phenomena 
Studies on biogeochemical variables and cycle 
Detecting, monitoring and predicting noxious or toxic algal blooms of notable extension 
Monitoring the health of marine ecosystem 
Coastal zone and resource management 
Producing an improved marine fisheries information to the fisherman communities 
Deriving Yellow dust and the land classified information

GOCI specification

GOCI bands

See also
Ocean color
Remote sensing
Geostationary orbit

References
https://web.archive.org/web/20130325103032/http://kosc.kordi.re.kr/oceansatellite/coms-goci/introduction.kosc
Seongick Cho, Yu-Hwan Ahn, Joo-Hyung Ryu, Gm-Sil Kang, and Heong-Sik Youn, “Development of Geostationary Ocean Color Imager (GOCI),” Korean Journal of Remote Sensing, vol.26, no.2, 2010, pp. 157–165.

External links
Korea Ocean Satellite Center (KOSC)
 Korea Institute of Ocean Science & Technology (KIOST)

Satellites in geosynchronous orbit
Satellite imaging sensors